Dolichyl-diphosphooligosaccharide—protein glycosyltransferase subunit DAD1 is an enzyme that in humans is encoded by the DAD1 gene.

Function 

DAD1, the defender against apoptotic cell death, was initially identified as a negative regulator of programmed cell death in the temperature sensitive tsBN7 cell line.  The DAD1 protein disappeared in temperature-sensitive cells following a shift to the nonpermissive temperature, suggesting that loss of the DAD1 protein triggered apoptosis.  DAD1 is believed to be a tightly associated subunit of oligosaccharyltransferase both in the intact membrane and in the purified enzyme, thus reflecting the essential nature of N-linked glycosylation in eukaryotes.

Interactions 

DAD1 has been shown to interact with MCL1.

References

Further reading